= Joseph McCarthy is Alive and Living in Dade County =

Joseph McCarthy is Alive and Living in Dade County is a 1977 musical revue featuring sketches, compositions, and lyrics by Ray Scantlin. It premiered on August 8, 1977, at the Caliboard Theater in Los Angeles.

== Summary ==
The show described itself as a "satirical" and "self-serving musical polemic on gay rights", exploring themes of "who has the right to judge, and in whose name they name their wars". It was directed by John Allison.

== Soundtrack ==
In 2005, a cast album for the show was released.

== Songs ==
- People Need Someone To Hate
- Schtick Center
- Rat On A Fag!
- Poetry
- Role Model
- Beethoven
- Lola
- Hay Fever
- A Southern Barbecue
- Who Have You Loved Today?
- Sunday School
- George And Gracie
- The Children
